The Lao Securities Exchange (LSX) is the primary stock exchange in Laos, located in the capital Vientiane. Companies on the LSX have raised more than LAK 6.7 trillion (approximately USD 750 million)

History
In 2010, the Lao government sought technical and financial support from South Korea (Korea Exchange has a 49-percent stake in the LSX), as well as advice from neighbouring Thailand, to help build the exchange.

The glass-building cost $10 million to build. It began operations on 11 January 2011.

Companies
There are currently 11 listed companies on the stock exchange:

References

Economy of Laos
Stock exchanges in Southeast Asia
Financial services companies established in 2011